The Rainforest Ecological Train or Waterfalls Train (Tren Ecológico de la Selva or Tren de las Cataratas) is a  narrow gauge train that runs through the forest inside Iguazú National Park in the north of the province of Misiones of Argentina.

Characteristics 

It carries approximately 900,000 visitors yearly.

The train was built in England by Alan Keef Ltd, in Ross-on-Wye. It is painted green and the propane-fired locomotive pulls up to five opened-roofed carriages with wooden seats at the sides so that the passengers can view the forest.

The journey takes about 20 minutes.

Stations 
Central: Main terminal with a commercial area, restrooms, first-aid room and Park Ranger offices.
Cataratas (Waterfalls):  A square, lounge area, fast food services and restrooms. Pathways to the Lower and Upper Circuits.
Garganta (Devil's Gorge):  A square, restrooms and fast food premises. The Garganta del Diablo walkway leads to viewing platforms built over the lip of the waterfall.

See also
 Iguazú National Park
 Iguazú Falls
 List of heritage railways

References

External links

 Tren Ecológico on Iguazú Argentina (archived)
 Tren Ecológico on Parque Iguazú
 Ecological Rainforest Train on Patagonia-Argentina 
 Tren ecológico history and information (archived, Feb 2009)

Tourist attractions in Misiones Province
Railway lines in Argentina
600 mm gauge railways in Argentina
Transport in Misiones Province